Emanuel Cohen (1892 - 1977) was an American film producer. He was vice president in charge of production at Paramount Pictures from 1932 to 1935. From 1935 he had his own production company, Major Films, making films starring Mae West and Bing Crosby among others.

Select filmography
Pennies from Heaven (1936)
On Such a Night (1937)
The Girl from Scotland Yard (1937)
Every Day's a Holiday (1938)

References

External links
Emanuel Cohen at IMDb
Emanuel Cohen at BFI

American film producers
1892 births
1977 deaths